Rairangpur Airstrip, also known as Dandbose Airstrip, is located 6 km away from Rairangpur city center in Mayurbhanj district, Odisha, India. Rairangpur Airstrip is spread over 61 acres and is under the control of the Works Department of Government of Odisha. The runway is 750 meters (around 3280 ft) long and is periodically maintained by the state government.

Currently, there are no scheduled operations to and from this airstrip. The nearest airport is Sonari Airport in Jamshedpur, Jharkhand, 71 km from Rairangpur Airport. The state capital Bhubaneswar's Biju Patnaik International Airport is nearly 275 km from Rairangpur Airstrip.

See also
List of airports in India

References

Airports in Odisha
Mayurbhanj district
Airports with year of establishment missing